Lumid Pau Airport  is an airport serving the village of Lumid Pau, in the Upper Takutu-Upper Essequibo Region of Guyana.

See also

 List of airports in Guyana
 Transport in Guyana

References

External links
OpenStreetMap - Lumid Pau
OurAirports - Lumid Pau
HERE/Nokia - Lumid Pau
SkyVector Aeronautical Charts

Airports in Guyana